Daughter From Another Mother is a 2021 Mexican streaming television series starring Ludwika Paleta and Paulina Goto. The series premiered on Netflix on January 20, 2021. The series tells of two very different mothers, whose babies are switched at birth, being forced to come together and raise their daughters in one family.

Since its release, it was viewed by 23 million households.

Season 2 premiered on Netflix globally on December 24, 2021 and season 3 on December 25, 2022.

Cast 
 Ludwika Paleta as Ana Servín
 Paulina Goto as Mariana Herrera
 Martín Altomaro as Juan Carlos
 Liz Gallardo as Teresa "Tere"
 Dalexa Meneses as Ceci
 Emilio Beltrán as Rodrigo "Ro"
 Zaide Silvia Gutiérrez as Lucía, Mariana's grandmother
 Javier Ponce as Pablo Sandoval
 Oka Giner as Elena
 Rodrigo Cachero as Víctor, Juan Carlos's brother
 Nora Velázquez as Altagracia
 Elena del Río as Cynthia
 Lisa Owen as Ana's mother, Romelia
 Christian Chávez as Manolo
 Carmen Delgado as Laura Villa, lawyer

Episodes

Series Overview

Season 1 (2021)

Season 2

References

External links
 
 

2021 Mexican television series debuts
2020s Mexican comedy television series
2020s Mexican drama television series
Spanish-language Netflix original programming